Katie Cordelia Thompson (born 28 September 1996) is an English cricketer who currently plays for Yorkshire. She plays as a slow left-arm unorthodox bowler. She previously played for North Representative XI, as well as playing for Yorkshire Diamonds in the Women's Cricket Super League between 2016 and 2018.

Domestic career
Thompson made her county debut in 2014, for Yorkshire against Essex. In 2015, Thompson helped her side to their 6th County Championship title, and took 5 wickets at an average of 26.80. The following season, she was her side's leading wicket-taker in the 2016 Women's County Championship, with 12 wickets at an average of 12, including taking 6/10 against Somerset. In 2018, Thompson was again successful, taking 11 wickets in both the County Championship and Twenty20 Cup. In 2019, Thompson was the joint-leading wicket-taker across the whole Championship, with 15 wickets at an average of 8.40. She also took her Twenty20 best bowling figures, with 4/4 against Durham. In 2021, Thompson was named as part of the Yorkshire contingent of the North Representative XI squad for the Twenty20 Cup, taking one wicket in four matches.

Thompson also played for Yorkshire Diamonds in the Women's Cricket Super League between 2016 and 2018. She played four matches across the three seasons, with her best performance coming in a 2018 match against Loughborough Lightning, in which she took 2/18 from her four overs.

References

External links

1996 births
Living people
Place of birth missing (living people)
Yorkshire women cricketers
North Representative XI cricketers
Yorkshire Diamonds cricketers